Dolbina krikkeni is a species of moth of the  family Sphingidae. It is known from Sumatra.

References

Dolbina
Moths described in 1975